Body/Head are an American experimental electric guitar duo composed of Kim Gordon and Bill Nace. They began working together in 2011 in Massachusetts, but the Body/Head concept evolved more specifically in early 2012. Their debut album, Coming Apart, was released on Matador Records on September 10, 2013.

Discography
Body/Head (EP) (January 8, 2013) - Open Mouth 
Coming Apart (September 10, 2013) - Matador
The Show Is Over (EP) (November 4, 2014) - Matador
No Waves (November 11, 2016) - Matador
The Switch (July 13, 2018) - Matador

References

External links

2012 establishments in Massachusetts
Alternative rock groups from Massachusetts
American musical duos
Matador Records artists
Musical groups established in 2012
Rock music duos
Sonic Youth